"Unk" in Funk is an album by blues musician Muddy Waters released by the Chess label in 1974.

Reception

AllMusic reviewer Lindsay Planer stated "The nine sides on Unk in Funk (1974) are among the last newly recorded material that Muddy Waters would issue during his nearly 30 year association with Chess Records. Backing up the Chicago blues icon is a band he'd carry with him for the remainder of his performing career ... They run through a better than average selection of Waters' classics with newer compositions more or less tossed in, presumably to keep the track list fresh. Although Waters certainly has nothing to prove, he attacks his old catalog with the drive and command of a man putting it all on the line".

Track listing 
All compositions by  McKinley Morganfield  except where noted
 "Rollin' and Tumblin'" – 7:28
 "Just to Be with You" (Berney Roth) – 3:55
 "Electric Man" (Amelia Cooper, Terry Abrahamson) – 3:10
 "Trouble No More" – 2:40
 ""Unk" in Funk" (Cooper, Abrahamson, Ted Kerland) – 3:22
 "Drive My Blues Away" – 2:48
 "Katie" – 3:04
 "Waterboy Waterboy" – 4:00
 "Everything Gonna Be Alright" (Walter Jacobs) – 3:35

Personnel 
Muddy Waters – vocals, guitar
Carey Bell Harrington (tracks 1-3 & 6-8), George Buford (tracks 4 & 9), Paul Oscher (track 5) – harmonica
Pinetop Perkins – piano, harpsichord
Bob Margolin, Luther Johnson – guitar
Calvin Jones – bass
Willie Smith – drums

References 

1974 albums
Muddy Waters albums
Chess Records albums
Albums produced by Ralph Bass